Walt: The Man Behind the Myth is a 2001 biographical documentary film about Walt Disney. It was narrated by Dick Van Dyke and directed by Jean-Pierre Isbouts.

Summary 
Dick Van Dyke narrates as those who knew Walt share stories to piece together his personal and professional life, including the creations of Oswald the Lucky Rabbit, Mickey Mouse, Snow White and the Seven Dwarfs, Fantasia, Bambi, Disneyland, EPCOT (concept), and Disney World. More personal details explored are his and wife Lillian Disney's fertility struggles, the loss of his mother, and his health at the end of his life.

Cast 

 Bob Broughton
 Buddy Baker
 Dick Van Dyke
Harrison "Buzz" Price
John Lasseter
Ken Annakin
 Marian Galanis
Michael Broggie
Ray Bradbury
 Sharon Baird
Xavier Atencio

See also

Walt Disney: An American Original - 1976 book by Bob Thomas similar in content
Saving Mr. Banks - 2013 film about the making of Mary Poppins
Walt & El Grupo

References

External links

Walt: The Man Behind the Myth on Netflix

2001 television films
2001 films
Documentary films about entertainers
Films directed by Jean-Pierre Isbouts
Disney documentary films
Works about Walt Disney
2000s American films
Films about Disney